Nostratic is a controversial hypothetical macrofamily, which includes many of the indigenous language families of Eurasia, although its exact composition and structure vary among proponents. It typically comprises Kartvelian, Indo-European and Uralic languages; some languages from the similarly controversial Altaic family; the Afroasiatic languages; as well as the Dravidian languages (sometimes also Elamo-Dravidian).

The hypothetical ancestral language of the Nostratic family is called Proto-Nostratic. According to Allan R. Bomhard, Proto-Nostratic would have been spoken between 15,000 and 12,000 BCE, in the Epipaleolithic period, close to the end of the last glacial period, perhaps in or near the Fertile Crescent.

The Nostratic hypothesis originates with Holger Pedersen in the early 20th century. The name "Nostratic" is due to Pedersen (1903), derived from the Latin nostrates "fellow countrymen". The hypothesis was significantly expanded in the 1960s by Soviet linguists, notably Vladislav Illich-Svitych and Aharon Dolgopolsky, termed the "Moscovite school" by Allan Bomhard (2008, 2011, and 2014), and it has received renewed attention in English-speaking academia since the 1990s.

The hypothesis is controversial and has varying degrees of acceptance amongst linguists worldwide with most rejecting Nostratic and many other macrofamily hypotheses. In Russia, it is endorsed by a minority of linguists, such as Vladimir Dybo, but is not a generally accepted hypothesis. Some linguists take an agnostic view. Eurasiatic, a similar grouping, was proposed by Joseph Greenberg (2000) and endorsed by Merritt Ruhlen: it is taken as a subfamily of Nostratic by Bomhard (2008).

History of research

Origin of the Nostratic hypothesis
The last quarter of the 19th century saw various linguists putting forward proposals linking the Indo-European languages to other language families, such as Finno-Ugric and Altaic.

These proposals were taken much further in 1903 when Holger Pedersen proposed "Nostratic", a common ancestor for the Indo-European, Finno-Ugric, Samoyed, Turkish, Mongolian, Manchu, Yukaghir, Eskimo, Semitic, and Hamitic languages, with the door left open to the eventual inclusion of others.

The name Nostratic derives from the Latin word nostrās, meaning 'our fellow-countryman' (plural: nostrates) and has been defined, since Pedersen, as consisting of those language families that are related to Indo-European. Merritt Ruhlen notes that this definition is not properly taxonomic but amorphous, since there are broader and narrower degrees of relatedness, and moreover, some linguists who broadly accept the concept (such as Greenberg and Ruhlen himself) have criticised the name as reflecting the ethnocentrism frequent among Europeans at the time. Martin Bernal has described the term as distasteful because it implies that speakers of other language families are excluded from academic discussion. Even so, the concept arguably transcends ethnocentric associations. (Indeed, Pedersen's older contemporary Henry Sweet attributed some of the resistance by Indo-European specialists to hypotheses of wider genetic relationships as "prejudice against dethroning [Indo-European] from its proud isolation and affiliating it to the languages of yellow races".) Proposed alternative names such as Mitian, formed from the characteristic Nostratic first- and second-person pronouns mi 'I' and ti 'you' (exactly 'thee'), have not attained the same currency.

An early supporter was the French linguist Albert Cuny—better known for his role in the development of the laryngeal theory—who published his Recherches sur le vocalisme, le consonantisme et la formation des racines en « nostratique », ancêtre de l'indo-européen et du chamito-sémitique ('Researches on the Vocalism, Consonantism, and Formation of Roots in "Nostratic", Ancestor of Indo-European and Hamito-Semitic') in 1943. Although Cuny enjoyed a high reputation as a linguist, the work was coldly received.

Moscow School of Comparative Linguistics

While Pedersen's Nostratic hypothesis did not make much headway in the West, it became quite popular in what was then the Soviet Union. Working independently at first, Vladislav Illich-Svitych and Aharon Dolgopolsky elaborated the first version of the contemporary form of the hypothesis during the 1960s. They expanded it to include additional language families. Illich-Svitych also prepared the first dictionary of the hypothetical language.

A principal source for the items in Illich-Svitych's dictionary was the earlier work of Alfredo Trombetti (1866–1929), an Italian linguist who had developed a classification scheme for all the world's languages, widely reviled at the time and subsequently ignored by almost all linguists. In Trombetti's time, a widely held view on classifying languages was that similarity in inflections is the surest proof of genetic relationship. In the interim, the view had taken hold that the comparative method—previously used as a means of studying languages already known to be related and without any thought of classification—is the most effective means to establish genetic relationship, eventually hardening into the conviction that it is the only legitimate means to do so. This view was basic to the outlook of the new Nostraticists. Although Illich-Svitych adopted many of Trombetti's etymologies, he sought to validate them by a systematic comparison of the sound systems of the languages concerned.

21st century
The chief events in Nostratic studies in 2008 were the online publication of the latest version of Dolgopolsky's Nostratic Dictionary and the publication of Allan Bomhard's comprehensive treatment of the subject, Reconstructing Proto-Nostratic, in 2 volumes. 2008 also saw the opening of a website, Nostratica, devoted to providing important texts in Nostratic studies online, which is now offline. Also significant was Bomhard's partly critical review of Dolgopolsky's dictionary, in which he argued that only those Nostratic etymologies that are strongest should be included, in contrast to Dolgopolsky's more expansive approach, which includes many etymologies that are possible but not secure.

In early 2014, Allan Bomhard published his latest monograph on Nostratic, A Comprehensive Introduction to Nostratic Comparative Linguistics.

Constituent language families
The language families proposed for inclusion in Nostratic vary, but all Nostraticists agree on a common core of language families, with differences of opinion appearing over the inclusion of additional families.

The three groups universally accepted among Nostraticists are Indo-European, Uralic, and Altaic; the validity of the Altaic family, while itself controversial, is taken for granted by Nostraticists. Nearly all also include the Kartvelian and Dravidian language families.

Following Pedersen, Illich-Svitych, and Dolgopolsky, most advocates of the theory have included Afroasiatic, though criticisms by Joseph Greenberg and others from the late 1980s onward suggested a reassessment of this position.

The Sumerian and Etruscan languages, usually regarded as language isolates, are thought by some to be Nostratic languages as well. Others, however, consider one or both to be members of another macrofamily called Dené–Caucasian. Another notional isolate, the Elamite language, also figures in a number of Nostratic classifications. It is frequently grouped with Dravidian as Elamo-Dravidian.

In 1987 Joseph Greenberg proposed a similar macrofamily which he called Eurasiatic. It included the same "Euraltaic" core (Indo-European, Uralic, and Altaic), but excluded some of the above-listed families, most notably Afroasiatic. At about this time Russian Nostraticists, notably Sergei Starostin, constructed a revised version of Nostratic which was slightly broader than Greenberg's grouping but which similarly left out Afroasiatic.

Beginning in the early 2000s, a consensus emerged among proponents of the Nostratic hypothesis. Greenberg basically agreed with the Nostratic concept, though he stressed a deep internal division between its northern 'tier' (his Eurasiatic) and a southern 'tier' (principally Afroasiatic and Dravidian). The American Nostraticist Allan Bomhard considers Eurasiatic a branch of Nostratic alongside other branches: Kartvelian, Afroasiatic, and Elamo-Dravidian. Similarly, Georgiy Starostin (2002) arrives at a tripartite overall grouping: he considers Afroasiatic, Nostratic and Elamite to be roughly equidistant and more closely related to each other than to anything else. Sergei Starostin's school has now re-included Afroasiatic in a broadly defined Nostratic, while reserving the term Eurasiatic to designate the narrower subgrouping which comprises the rest of the macrofamily. Recent proposals thus differ mainly on the precise placement of Kartvelian and Dravidian.

According to Greenberg, Eurasiatic and Amerind form a genetic node, being more closely related to each other than either is to "the other families of the Old World". There are a number of hypotheses incorporating Nostratic into an even broader linguistic 'mega-phylum', sometimes called Borean, which would also include at least the Dené–Caucasian and perhaps the Amerind and Austric superfamilies. The term SCAN has been used for a group that would include Sino-Caucasian, Amerind, and Nostratic.

The following table summarizes the constituent language families of Nostratic, as described by Holger Pedersen, Vladislav Illich-Svitych, Sergei Starostin, Allan Bomhard, and Aharon Dolgopolsky.

Urheimat and differentiation
Allan Bomhard and Colin Renfrew are in broad agreement with the earlier conclusions of Illich-Svitych and Dolgopolsky in seeking the Nostratic Urheimat (original homeland) within the Mesolithic (or Epipaleolithic) in the Fertile Crescent, the stage which directly preceded the Neolithic and was transitional to it.

Looking at the cultural assemblages of this period, two sequences, in particular, stand out as possible archeological correlates of the earliest Nostratians or their immediate precursors. Both hypotheses place Proto-Nostratic within the Fertile Crescent at around the end of the last glacial period.
The first of these is focused on the Levant. The Kebaran culture (20,000–17,000 BP) not only introduced the microlithic assemblage into the region, it also has African affinity specifically with the Ouchtata retouch technique associated with the microlithic Halfan culture of Egypt (20,000–17,000 BP) The Kebarans in their turn were directly ancestral to the succeeding Natufian culture (10,500–8500 BCE), which has enormous significance for prehistorians as the clearest evidence of hunters and gatherers in actual transition to Neolithic food production. Both cultures extended their influence outside the region into southern Anatolia. For example, in Cilicia the Belbaşı culture (13,000–10,000 BC) shows Kebaran influence, while the Beldibi culture (10,000–8500 BC) shows clear Natufian influence.
The second possibility as a culture associated with the Nostratic family is the Zarzian (12,400–8500 BC) culture of the Zagros mountains, stretching northwards into Kohistan in the Caucasus and eastwards into Iran. In western Iran, the M'lefatian culture (10,500–9000 BC) was ancestral to the assemblages of Ali Tappah (9000–5000 BC) and Jeitun (6000–4000 BC). Still further east, the Hissar culture has been seen as the Mesolithic precursor to the Keltiminar culture (5500–3500 BC) of the Kyrgyz steppe.

It has been proposed that the broad spectrum revolution of Kent Flannery (1969), associated with microliths, the use of the bow and arrow, and the domestication of the dog, all of which are associated with these cultures, might have been the cultural "motor" that led to their expansion. Certainly, cultures which appeared at Franchthi Cave in the Aegean and Lepenski Vir in the Balkans, and the Murzak-Koba (9100–8000 BC) and Grebenki (8500–7000 BC) cultures of the Ukrainian steppe, all displayed these adaptations.

Bomhard (2008) suggests a differentiation of Proto-Nostratic by 8,000 BCE, the beginning of the Neolithic Revolution in the Levant, over a territory spanning the entire Fertile Crescent and beyond into the Caucasus (Proto-Kartvelian), Egypt and along the Red Sea to the Horn of Africa (Proto-Afroasiatic), the Iranian Plateau (Proto-Elamo-Dravidian) and into Central Asia (Proto-Eurasiatic, to be further subdivided by 5,000 BCE into Proto-Indo-European, Proto-Uralic and Proto-Altaic).

According to some scholarly opinion the Kebaran is derived from the Levantine Upper Palaeolithic in which the microlithic component originated, although microlithic cultures were earlier found in Africa.

Ouchtata retouch is also a characteristic of the Late Ahmarian Upper Palaeolithic culture of the Levant and may not indicate African influence.

Reconstruction of Proto-Nostratic
The following data is taken from Kaiser and Shevoroshkin (1988) and Bengtson (1998) and transcribed into the IPA.

Phonology
The phonemes tabulated below are commonly reconstructed for the Proto-Nostratic language (Kaiser and Shevoroshkin 1988). Allan Bomhard (2008), who relies more heavily on Afroasiatic and Dravidian than on Uralic, as do members of the "Moscow School", reconstructs a different vowel system, with three pairs of vowels represented as: , as well as independent /i/, /o/, and /u/. In the first three pairs of vowels, Bomhard is attempting to specify the subphonemic variation involved, inasmuch as that variation led to some of the vowel gradation (ablaut) and vowel harmony patterning found in various daughter languages.

Consonants
The reconstructed consonants of Nostratic are shown in the table below. Every distinction is supposed to be contrastive by the Nostraticists who reconstruct them.

Vowels

Sound correspondences
The following table is compiled from data given by Kaiser and Shevoroshkin (1988) and Starostin. They follow Illich-Svitych's correspondences in which Nostratic voiceless stops give (traditional) PIE voiced ones, and Nostratic glottalized stops give (traditional) PIE voiceless stops, in contradiction with the PIE glottalic theory, which makes traditional PIE voiced stops appear like glottalized ones. To correct this anomaly, linguists such as Manaster Ramer and Bomhard have proposed to correlate Nostratic voiceless and glottalized stops with PIE ones, so this is done in the table.

Because linguists working on Proto-Indo-European, Proto-Uralic, and Proto-Dravidian do not usually use the IPA, the transcriptions used in those fields are also given where the letters differ from the IPA symbols. The IPA symbols are between slashes because this is a phonemic transcription. The exact values of the phoneme "*p₁" in Proto-Afroasiatic and Proto-Dravidian are unknown. "∅" indicates disappearance without a trace. Hyphens indicate different developments at the beginning and in the interior of words; no consonants ever occurred at the ends of word roots. (Starostin's list of affricate and fricative correspondences does not mention Afroasiatic or Dravidian, and Kaiser and Shevoroshkin don't mention these sounds much; hence the holes in the table.)

Note that there are at present several different mutually incompatible reconstructions of Proto-Afroasiatic (see  for two recent reconstructions). The one used here has been said to be based too strongly on Proto-Semitic (Yakubovich 1998).

Similarly, the paper by Kaiser and Shevoroshkin is much older than the Etymological Dictionary of the Altaic Languages (2003; see Altaic languages article) and therefore assumes a somewhat different phonological system for Proto-Altaic.

Morphology

Because grammar is less easily borrowed than words, grammar is usually considered stronger evidence for language relationships than vocabulary. The following correspondences (slightly modified to account for the reconstruction of Proto-Altaic by Starostin et al. [2003]) have been suggested by Kaiser and Shevoroshkin (1988). /N/ could be any nasal consonant. /V/ could be any vowel. (The above cautionary notes on Afroasiatic and Dravidian apply.)

In addition, Kaiser and Shevoroshkin write the following about Proto-Nostratic grammar (two asterisks are used for reconstructions based on reconstructions; citation format changed):

The verb stood at the end of the sentence (SV and SOV type). The 1st p[er]s[on] was formed by adding the 1st ps. pronoun **mi to the verb; similarly, the 2nd ps. was formed by adding **ti. There were no endings for the 3rd ps. present [or at least none can be reconstructed], while the 3rd ps. preterit ending was **-di (Illich-Svitych 1971, pp. 218–19). Verbs could be active and passive, causative, desiderative, and reflective; and there were special markers for most of these categories. Nouns could be animate or inanimate, and plural markers differed for each category. There were subject and object markers, locative and lative enclitic particles, etc. Pronouns distinguished direct and oblique forms, animate and inanimate categories, notions of the type 'near':'far', inclusive:exclusive [...], etc. Apparently there were no prefixes. Nostratic words were either equal to roots or built by adding endings or suffixes. There are some cases of word composition...

Lexicon

According to Dolgopolsky, Proto-Nostratic language had analytic structure, which he argues by diverging of post- and prepositions of auxiliary words in descendant languages.
Dolgopolsky states three lexical categories to be in the Proto-Nostratic language:
 Lexical words
 Pronouns
 Auxiliary words
Word order was subject–object–verb when the subject was a noun, and object–verb–subject when it was a pronoun. Attributive (expressed by a lexical word) preceded its head. Pronominal attributive ('my', 'this') might follow the noun. Auxiliary words are considered to be postpositions.

Personal pronouns
Personal pronouns are seldom borrowed between languages. Therefore the many correspondences between Nostratic pronouns are rather strong evidence for the existence of a Proto-Nostratic language. The difficulty of finding Afroasiatic cognates is, however, taken by some as evidence that Nostratic has two or three branches, Afroasiatic and Eurasiatic (and possibly Dravidian), and that most or all of the pronouns in the following table can only be traced to Proto-Eurasiatic.

Nivkh is a living (if moribund) language with an orthography, which is given here. /V/ means that it is not clear which vowel should be reconstructed.

For space reasons, Etruscan is not included, but the fact that it had /mi/ 'I' and /mini/ 'me' seems to fit the pattern reconstructed for Proto-Nostratic ideally, leading some to argue that the Aegean or Tyrsenian languages were yet another Nostratic branch.

There is no reconstruction of Proto-Eskimo–Aleut, although the existence of the Eskimo–Aleut family is generally accepted.

Other words
Below are selected reconstructed etymologies from Kaiser and Shevoroshkin (1988) and Bengtson (1998). Reconstructed ( = unattested) forms are marked with an asterisk. /V/ means that it is not clear which vowel should be reconstructed. Likewise, /E/ could have been any front vowel and /N/ any nasal consonant. Only the consonants are given of Proto-Afroasiatic roots (see above).

Proto-Nostratic  or  'who'
Proto-Indo-European  'who',  (with suffix -i-) 'what'. Ancestors of the English wh- words.
Proto-Afroasiatic  and  'who'.
Proto-Altaic ?. The presence of /a/ instead of /o/ is unexplained, but Kaiser and Shevoroshkin (1988) regard this alternation as common among Nostratic languages.
Proto-Uralic  'who'
"Yukaghir" (Northern, Southern, or both?) кин  'who'
Proto-Chukotko-Kamchatkan ,  'who'
Proto-Eskimo–Aleut  'who'
Proto-Indo-European  'heart'.
Afroasiatic: Proto-Chadic  'chest'
Proto-Kartvelian  (/m/ being a prefix) 'chest ~ breast'
Proto-Eskimo  'heart ~ breast'. The presence of /q/ instead of /k/ is not clear.
Proto-Turkic */køky-rʲ/ - 'chest'
Proto-Nostratic  'ear ~ hear'
Proto-Indo-European  'hear'. Ancestor of English listen, loud.
Proto-Afroasiatic  'hear'
Proto-Kartvelian  'ear'
Proto-Altaic  'ear'
Proto-Uralic  (long vowel from fusion of ) 'hear'
Proto-Dravidian  'hear'. (Must figure out if it's /g/- instead.)
Proto-Chukotko-Kamchatkan , possibly from earlier  'ear'
Proto-Nostratic  'stone'
Afroasiatic: Proto-Chadic  'stone'
Proto-Kartvelian  'stone'
Proto-Uralic  'stone'
Proto-Dravidian  'stone'
Proto-Chukotko-Kamchatkan  'stone'; Kamchadal квал , ков  'stone'
Proto-Eskimo–Aleut  'stone'
Proto-Nostratic  'water'
Proto-Indo-European  'water ~ wet'
Altaic: Proto-Tungusic  'water'
Proto-Uralic  'water'
Proto-Dravidian  'wet'
Proto-Nostratic  'storm'
Proto-Indo-European  'storm'
Proto-Afroasiatic (?)  'storm'
Proto-Altaic  'storm'
Proto-Uralic  'snow storm ~ smoke' (-/k/- unexplained)
Proto-Nostratic  'front side'
Proto-Indo-European  'front side'
Proto-Altaic  'front side'
Proto-Nostratic  'eat'
Proto-Indo-European  'satiated'
Proto-Afroasiatic (?)  'be fed' ~ 'be abundant'
Proto-Kartvelian  'become sated'
Proto-Altaic  'eat'
Proto-Uralic  or  'eat'
Proto-Nostratic  'grasp'
Proto-Indo-European  'grasp'
Proto-Dravidian  'grasp'
Proto-Nostratic */ʔekh₁-/ 'to move quickly, to rage; to be furious, raging, violent, spirited, fiery, wild (of a horse)'
Proto-Indo-European */h₁ek-u-/ 'quick, swift (of a horse)'
Proto-Altaic */èk`á/ 'to paw, hit with hooves; to move quickly, to rage (of a horse)'
Proto-Nostratic  'little'
Proto-Afroasiatic  'little'
Proto-Kartvelian  'little'
Proto-Dravidian  'little'. (Must figure out if plosives correct.)
Proto-Turkic */küčük/-g from Proto-Altaic */k`ič`V/ ( ~ -č-)

Sample text

In the 1960s, Vladislav Illich-Svitych composed a brief poem using his version of Proto-Nostratic. (Compare Schleicher's fable for similar attempts with several different reconstructions of Proto-Indo-European.)

Status within comparative linguistics

While the Nostratic hypothesis is not endorsed by the mainstream of comparative linguistics, Nostratic studies by nature of being based on the comparative method remain within the mainstream of contemporary linguistics from a methodological point of view; it is the scope with which the comparative method is applied rather than the methodology itself that raises eyebrows.

Nostraticists tend to refuse to include in their schema language families for which no proto-language has yet been reconstructed. This approach was criticized by Joseph Greenberg on the ground that genetic classification is necessarily prior to linguistic reconstruction, but this criticism has so far had no effect on Nostraticist theory and practice.

Certain critiques have pointed out that the data from individual, established language families that is cited in Nostratic comparisons often involves a high degree of errors; Campbell (1998) demonstrates this for Uralic data. Defenders of the Nostratic theory argue that were this to be true, it would remain that in classifying languages genetically, positives count for vastly more than negatives (Ruhlen 1994). The reason for this is that, above a certain threshold, resemblances in sound/meaning correspondences are highly improbable mathematically.

Pedersen's original Nostratic proposal synthesized earlier macrofamilies, some of which, including Indo-Uralic, involved extensive comparison of inflections. It is true the Russian Nostraticists and Bomhard initially emphasized lexical comparisons. Bomhard recognized the necessity to explore morphological comparisons and has since published extensive work in this area (see especially Bomhard 2008:1.273–386). According to him the breakthrough came with the publication of the first volume of Joseph Greenberg's Eurasiatic work, which provided a massive list of possible morphemic correspondences that has proved fruitful to explore. Other important contributions on Nostratic morphology have been published by John C. Kerns and Vladimir Dybo.

Critics argue that were one to collect all the words from the various known Indo-European languages and dialects which have at least one of any 4 meanings, one could easily form a list that would cover any conceivable combination of two consonants and a vowel (of which there are only about 20×20×5 = 2000). Nostraticists respond that they do not compare isolated lexical items but reconstructed proto-languages. To include a word for a proto-language it must be found in a number of languages and the forms must be relatable by regular sound changes. In addition, many languages have restrictions on root structure, reducing the number of possible root-forms far below its mathematical maximum. These languages include, among others, Indo-European, Uralic, and Altaic—all the core languages of the Nostratic hypothesis. To understand how the root structures of one language relate to those of another has long been a focus of Nostratic studies. For a highly critical assessment of the work of the Moscow School, especially the work of Illich-Svitych, cf. Campbell and Poser 2008:243-264.
Campbell and Poser argue that Nostratic, as reconstructed by Illich-Svitych and others, is "typologically flawed". For instance, they point out that, surprisingly, very few Nostratic roots contain two voiceless stops, which are less marked and should therefore occur more frequently, and where such roots do occur, in almost all cases the second stop occurs after a sonorant. In summary, Campbell and Poser reject the Nostratic hypothesis and, as a parting shot, state that they "seriously doubt that further research will result in any significant support for this hypothesized macro-family."

It has also been argued that Nostratic comparisons mistake Wanderwörter and cross-borrowings between branches for true cognates.

See also

Borean languages
Classification of Japanese
Indo-Semitic languages
Indo-Uralic languages
Proto-Human language
Proto-Uralic language
Ural–Altaic languages
Uralic–Yukaghir languages
Uralo-Siberian languages

Notes

References

Bibliography
Baldi, Philip (2002). The Foundations of Latin. Berlin: Mouton de Gruyter.
Bengtson, John D. (1998). "The 'Far East' of Nostratic". Mother Tongue Newsletter 31:35–38 (image files)
Bomhard, Allan R., and John C. Kerns (1994). The Nostratic Macrofamily: A Study in Distant Linguistic Relationship. Berlin, New York, and Amsterdam: Mouton de Gruyter. 
Bomhard, Allan R. (1996). Indo-European and the Nostratic Hypothesis. Signum Publishers.
Bomhard, Allan R. (2008). Reconstructing Proto-Nostratic: Comparative Phonology, Morphology, and Vocabulary, 2 volumes. Leiden: Brill. 
Bomhard, Allan R. (2008). A Critical Review of Dolgopolsky's Nostratic Dictionary.
Bomhard, Allan R. (2008). [https://web.archive.org/web/20110810015450/http://www.nostratic.ru/books/(217)Nostratic%20Sound%20Correspondences.pdf The Glottalic Theory of Proto-Indo-European and Consonantism and Its Implications for Nostratic Sound Correspondences]. Mother Tongue.
Bomhard, Allan R. (2011). The Nostratic Hypothesis in 2011: Trends and Issues. Washington, DC: Institute for the Study of Man. ISBN (paperback) 978-0-9845383-0-0
Bomhard, Allan R. (2018). A Comprehensive Introduction to Nostratic Comparative Linguistics: With Special Reference to Indo-European. Four volumes, 2,807 pages, combined into a single PDF; published as an open-access book under a Creative Commons license.
Bomhard, Allan R., (December 2020). A Critical Review of Illič-Svityč's Nostratic Dictionary. Published as an open-access book under a Creative Commons license.
Campbell, Lyle (1998). "Nostratic: a personal assessment". In Joseph C. Salmons and Brian D. Joseph (eds.), Nostratic: Sifting the Evidence. Current Issues in Linguistic Theory 142. John Benjamins.
Campbell, Lyle, and William J. Poser (2008). Language Classification: History and Method. Cambridge: Cambridge University Press.
Campbell, Lyle (2004). Historical Linguistics: An Introduction (2nd ed.). Cambridge: The MIT Press.
Cuny, Albert (1924). Etudes prégrammaticales sur le domaine des langues indo-européennes et chamito-sémitiques. Paris: Champion.
Cuny, Albert (1943). Recherches sur le vocalisme, le consonantisme et la formation des racines en « nostratique », ancêtre de l'indo-européen et du chamito-sémitique. Paris: Adrien Maisonneuve.
Cuny, Albert (1946). Invitation à l'étude comparative des langues indo-européennes et des langues chamito-sémitiques. Bordeaux: Brière.
Dolgopolsky, Aharon (1998). The Nostratic Macrofamily and Linguistic Paleontology. McDonald Institute for Archaeological Research. 
Dolgopolsky, Aharon (2008). Nostratic Dictionary. McDonald Institute for Archaeological Research. 
Dybo, Vladimir (2004). "On Illič-Svityč's study ‘Basic Features of the Proto-Language of the Nostratic Language Family'." In Nostratic Centennial Conference: The Pécs Papers, edited by Irén Hegedűs and Paul Sidwell, 115-119. Pécs: Lingua Franca Group.
Flannery, Kent V. (1969). In: P. J. Ucko and G. W. Dimbleby (eds.), The Domestication and Exploitation of Plants and Animals 73-100. Aldine, Chicago, IL.
Gamkrelidze, Thomas V., and Vjačeslav V. Ivanov (1995). Indo-European and the Indo-Europeans, translated by Johanna Nichols, 2 volumes. Berlin and New York: Mouton de Gruyter. 
Greenberg, Joseph (2000, 2002). Indo-European and its Closest Relatives. The Eurasiatic Language Family. (Stanford University), v.1 Grammar, v.2 Lexicon.
Greenberg, Joseph (2005). Genetic Linguistics: Essays on Theory and Method, edited by William Croft. Oxford: Oxford University Press.
Illich-Svitych, V. M. В. М. Иллич-Свитыч (1971-1984). Опыт сравнения ностратических языков (семитохамитский, картвельский, индоевропейский, уральский, дравидийский, алтайский). Введение. Сравнительный словарь. 3 vols. Moscow: Наука.

Kaiser, M. (1989). "Remarks on Historical Phonology: From Nostratic to Indo-European" . Reconstructing Languages and Cultures BPX 20:51-56.
Manaster Ramer, Alexis (?). A "Glottalic" Theory of Nostratic .
Norquest, Peter (1998). "Greenberg's Visit to Arizona". Mother Tongue Newsletter 31:25f. (image files)

Renfrew, Colin, and Daniel Nettle, editors (1999). Nostratic: Examining a Linguistic Macrofamily. McDonald Institute for Archaeological Research. 
Ruhlen, Merritt (1991). A Guide to the World's Languages, Volume 1: Classification. Edward Arnold. 
Ruhlen, Merritt (1994). On the Origin of Languages: Studies in Linguistic Taxonomy. Stanford, California: Stanford University Press.
Ruhlen, Merritt (1998). "Toutes parentes, toutes différentes". La Recherche 306:69–75. (French translation of a Scientific American article.)
Ruhlen, Merritt (2001). "Taxonomic Controversies in the Twentieth Century". In: Jürgen Trabant and Sean Ward (eds.), New Essays on the Origin of Language 197–214. Berlin: Mouton de Gruyter.
Salmons, Joseph C., and Brian D. Joseph, editors (1998). Nostratic: Sifting the Evidence. John Benjamins. 
Stachowski, Marek, "Teoria nostratyczna i szkoła moskiewska".(pdf) – LingVaria 6/1 (2011): 241-274
Starostin, Georgiy S. (1998). "Alveolar Consonants in Proto-Dravidian: One or More?". (pdf) Pages 1–14 (?) in Proceedings on South Asian languages
Starostin, Georgiy S. (2002). "On the Genetic Affiliation of the Elamite Language". (pdf) Mother Tongue 7.
Starostin, George; Kassian, Alexei; Trofimov, Artem; Zhivlov, Mikhail. 2017. 400-item basic wordlist for potentially "Nostratic" languages. Moscow: Laboratory for Oriental and Comparative Studies of the School of Advanced Studies in the Humanities, Russian Presidential Academy.
Sweet, Henry (1900, 1995, 2007). The History of Language.  (1995);  (2007)
Szemerényi, Oswald (1996). Introduction to Indo-European Linguistics. Oxford: Oxford University Press.
Trask, R. L. (1996). Historical Linguistics. New York: Oxford University Press.
Yakubovich, I. (1998). Nostratic studies in Russia

Further reading

 Hage, Per. “On the Reconstruction of the Proto-Nostratic Kinship System”. In: Zeitschrift Für Ethnologie 128, no. 2 (2003): 311–25. http://www.jstor.org/stable/25842921.
 Manaster Ramer, Alexis (1993). “On Illič-Svityč's Nostratic Theory”. In: Studies in Language 17: 205—250
 WITCZAK K.T., KOWALSKI A.P. (2012). "Nostratyka. Wspólnota językowa indoeuropejska". In: Przeszłość społeczna. Próba konceptualizacji, red. S. Tabaczyński i in. (red.), Poznań, pp. 826–837.

External links
Stefan Georg, 2013, Review of Salmons & Joseph, eds, Nostratic: Sifting the Evidence, 1997
"Linguists debating deepest roots of language" – New York Times article on Nostratic (June 27, 1995)
"What is Nostratic?" by John Bengtson, in Mother Tongue Newsletter 31 (1998), pages 33–38
"Nostraticist Vladislav Markovich Illich-Svitych" – photograph, Nostratic poem (2002)
Proposed descent tree for Borean languages, including Nostratic by Sergei Starostin
Database query to Nostratic etymology on StarLing database (last modified 2006)
Nostratic Dictionary by Aharon Dolgopolsky (2006): main page at Cambridge University DSpace and "Preface" by Colin Renfrew

 
Proposed language families
Linguistic theories and hypotheses
Moscow School of Comparative Linguistics
1903 in science